Ebnerella is an unaccepted scientific name and may refer to two different genera:
 Amphoriscus,  genus of sea sponges
 Mammillaria, a genus of cacti